Asháninka (also known as Campa, although this name is derogatory) is an Arawakan language spoken by the Asháninka people of Peru and Acre, Brazil.  It is largely spoken in the Satipo Province located in the amazon forest. While there are low literacy rates in Asháninka, language use is vibrant among the Asháninka.

Classification

The Campa (or Pre-Andean) group of the Maipurean language family includes what have been called Asháninka, Gran Pajonal Campa, Ashéninka, Axaninca, Machiguenga, and Nomatsiguenga. As these are all very closely related linguistic systems, the decision to call them dialects of a single language or different languages rests on social and political considerations rather than linguistic similarity or difference, as in so many other places in the world. Attempts to unify the varieties with one written standard have not been successful.

History

The language has also been called both Asháninka and Campa; the latter of which is considered by the Asháninka to be offensive, as it derives from the Quechua word thampa, meaning ragged and dirty. Like all languages that have a predominance in any particular region of Perú, Asháninka is an official language in the area in which it is spoken, as provided by the Constitution. Literacy rates range from 10% to 30%, compared to 15% to 25% literacy for the second language, Spanish.

Phonology

Consonants 

Following voiced nasals, voiceless plosives become voiced. Preceding an [a] vowel, a [k] sound becomes labialized as [kʷ]. A labial sound [w] is formed when two vowels /oa/ are together.

Vowels

Language basics and comparisons

Threats

This language can be categorized as vulnerable for a multitude of reasons. South America has been a target for logging and other deforestation efforts, that are oftentimes illegal. Those that speak Asháninka call the historically dense rainforests of Peru and Brazil their home, and live off this land. This habitat, specially in the Peruvian side, faces a moderate threat from logging and other destructive practices by outside forces.

References

Further reading
  Cushimariano Romano, Rubén and Richer C. Sebastián Q. (2009). Diccionario asháninka–castellano (versión preliminar). 
  Crevels, Mily, Lyle Campbell, Veronica Grondona, and Mouton De Gruyter. "Language Endangerment in South America: The Clock Is Ticking." A Comprehensive Guide The Indigenous Languages of South America, 2012, 167-234.
"Asháninka." Language, Alphabet and Pronunciation. Accessed May 5, 2016.

External links

 "Base De Datos De Pueblos Indígenas U Originarios." Base De Datos De Pueblos Indígenas U Originarios. Accessed March 11, 2016. 
   Language Archives.org
 "Native American Vocabulary: Ashaninka Words (Campa)." Ashaninka Words (Campa, Ashninka). 2015. 
"The Endangered Languages Project." Endangered Languages Project. Accessed May 5, 2016. 

Languages of Peru
Campa languages